Pachylaena is a genus of South American flowering plants in the tribe Mutisieae within the family Asteraceae.

 Species
 Pachylaena atriplicifolia D.Don ex Hook. & Arn. - Chile, Argentina
 Pachylaena rosea I.M.Johnst. - Chile
 formerly included
see Chaetanthera 
 Pachylaena elegans Phil. - Chaetanthera flabellifolia Cabrera

References

Mutisieae
Asteraceae genera
Flora of South America